HMCS Royal Mount was a  that served with the Royal Canadian Navy during the Second World War. She was used primarily as an ocean convoy escort in the Battle of the Atlantic.

Royal Mount was ordered on 1 February 1943 as part of the 1943–1944 River-class building program. She was laid down on 7 January 1944 as Alvington by Canadian Vickers Ltd. at Montreal and launched 15 April 1944. Her name was changed and she was commissioned as Royal Mount on 25 August 1944 at Montreal.

Background

The River-class frigate was designed by William Reed of Smith's Dock Company of South Bank-on-Tees. Originally called a "twin-screw corvette", its purpose was to improve on the convoy escort classes in service with the Royal Navy at the time, including the Flower-class corvette. The first orders were placed by the Royal Navy in 1940 and the vessels were named for rivers in the United Kingdom, giving name to the class. In Canada they were named for towns and cities though they kept the same designation. The name "frigate" was suggested by Vice-Admiral Percy Nelles of the Royal Canadian Navy and was adopted later that year.

Improvements over the corvette design included improved accommodation which was markedly better. For underwater targets, the River-class frigate was equipped with a Hedgehog anti-submarine mortar and depth charge rails aft and four side-mounted throwers.

River-class frigates were the first Royal Canadian Navy warships to carry the 147B Sword horizontal fan echo sonar transmitter in addition to the irregular ASDIC. This allowed the ship to maintain contact with targets even while firing unless a target was struck. Improved radar and direction-finding equipment improved the RCN's ability to find and track enemy submarines over the previous classes.

Canada originally ordered the construction of 33 frigates in October 1941. The design was too big for the shipyards on the Great Lakes so all the frigates built in Canada were built in dockyards along the west coast or along the St. Lawrence River. In all Canada ordered the construction of 60 frigates including ten for the Royal Navy that transferred two to the United States Navy.

Service history
Royal Mount sailed for Halifax and worked up at Bermuda in September 1944. Upon her return she was assigned to the Mid-Ocean Escort Force (MOEF) escort group C-1 as a trans-Atlantic convoy escort, joining up with the group in November. She remained with the group until May 1945, when she returned to Canada for the final time. Royal Mount underwent a refit from May 26 to 5 October 1945 at Sydney, Nova Scotia. She was decommissioned 17 November 1945 and placed in reserve at Bedford Basin. She remained there until her purchase in 1947 for scrap. The ship was broken up at New York City in 1948. The ship's bell lies in the entrance to the town hall of Mount Royal. The ship was commemorated during the Canadian Naval Centennial.

References

Citations

References
Macpherson, Ken; Burgess, John. The ships of Canada's naval forces 1910–1981 : a complete pictorial history of Canadian warships. Collins: Toronto, 1981. 

River-class frigates of the Royal Canadian Navy
1944 ships